MIUNIKU is a Mumbai-based luxury womenswear clothing and accessories label designed by sisters Nikita and Tina Sutradhar. They both attended London College of Fashion and completed a BA (Hons) in Womenswear graduating in June 2013. As runners-up, Miuniku were LVMH finalists who won a special prize of Euros 100,000 and one year mentorship with LVHM.  Their design is inspired by their unique blend of modernity and tradition and the colours inspired by India and mixed with western cuts.

References

Clothing brands
Companies based in Mumbai
Indian companies established in 2013
2013 establishments in Maharashtra
Clothing companies established in 2013